This is a list of members of the Western Australian Legislative Assembly between the 1924 election and the 1927 election, together known as the 12th Parliament. During the previous term, the Country Party had split into rival factions, the Ministerial Country Party (MCP) which comprised the bulk of the parliamentary party—many of whom had switched allegiance from other parties since 1919—and the Executive Country Party (ECP), which was loyal to the Primary Producers' Association, which the Country Party was intended to represent in Parliament. After the 1924 election, which significantly strengthened the latter at the expense of the former, the Ministerial arm merged with the Nationalist Party, as did the National Labor Party, which lost most of its representation in the election.

Notes
 Following the 1924 state election a new Ministry consisting of six members, including one Member of the Legislative Council, was appointed. These members were therefore required to resign and contest ministerial by-elections on 1 May 1924, at which all were returned unopposed.
 On 23 February 1925, the Labor member for Forrest, John Holman, died. The Labor candidate and daughter of the deceased, May Holman, was elected unopposed on 3 April 1925.

Sources
 
 

Members of Western Australian parliaments by term